St Paul Covent Garden  was a civil parish in the metropolitan area of London, England. The former area of the parish now corresponds to the Covent Garden market and surrounding streets in the City of Westminster.

History
It was created in 1645 from part of the ancient parish of St Martin in the Fields, and was within the Liberty of Westminster. The parish was included in the returns of the bills of mortality.

St Paul Covent Garden was completely surrounded by the parish of St Martin in the Fields. It was grouped into the Strand District in 1855 when it came within the area of responsibility of the Metropolitan Board of Works.

In 1889 the parish became part of the County of London and in 1900 it became part of the Metropolitan Borough of Westminster. It was abolished as a civil parish in 1922.

Poor law
The parish workhouse in Cleveland Street, Marylebone became the workhouse of the Strand Poor Law Union in 1836.

References

History of local government in London (pre-1855)
History of the City of Westminster
Parishes united into districts (Metropolis)
Former civil parishes in London
Bills of mortality parishes
1645 establishments in England